John Joseph O'Neill (born 26 August 1957) is a musician who is the rhythm guitarist and principal songwriter of the punk rock/new wave band The Undertones. O'Neill, along with his younger brother Vincent and friends Feargal Sharkey, Michael Bradley and Billy Doherty, founded The Undertones in 1975, although Vincent O'Neill was replaced the following year with his younger brother Damian O'Neill, who became the band's lead guitarist.

John O'Neill wrote the majority of the band's singles and a number of album tracks (occasionally collaborating with his brother Damian or Michael Bradley). Undertones songs written by John O'Neill include the singles "Teenage Kicks", "Jimmy Jimmy", "Here Comes The Summer" and "You've Got My Number", and such notable album tracks as "When Saturday Comes" and "You're Welcome".

After releasing four albums and thirteen singles, The Undertones disbanded in 1983; they reformed in November 1999. Since then, the band (who have a new lead singer, fellow Derry native Paul McLoone who also serves as a radio presenter for the Irish national and independent radio station Today FM) have released two further albums and performed a number of gigs in both the UK, Ireland, Europe and North America.

In 1985 the O'Neill brothers formed That Petrol Emotion, an acclaimed rock act who disbanded in 1994.

In the 1990s he formed a trip hop group called Rare under the stage name Seán Ó'Néill with vocalist Mary Gallagher. Despite some positive reviews in the music press they only had one notable chart appearance and disbanded shortly after the release of their only album in 1998.

References

External links
 AU Magazine interview with John O'Neill (archive)
 Official Undertones website

1957 births
Living people
Musicians from Derry (city)
New wave musicians from Northern Ireland
Rock guitarists from Northern Ireland
The Undertones members
That Petrol Emotion members